Françoise Ballet-Blu (born 9 May 1964) is a French politician who has been Member of Parliament for Vienne's 1st constituency from 2020 to 2022. She ran for reelection in 2022 but lost her seat to Lisa Belluco, the NUPES candidate.

References 

1964 births
Living people
21st-century French women politicians
Women members of the National Assembly (France)
Deputies of the 15th National Assembly of the French Fifth Republic
La République En Marche! politicians
People from Vienne